The 2011–12 UTSA Roadrunners men's basketball team represented the University of Texas at San Antonio in the 2011–12 college basketball season. This was head coach Brooks Thompson's sixth season at UTSA. This was their final season as members of the West Division of the Southland Conference as they will move to the Western Athletic Conference on July 1, 2012. They play their home games at the Convocation Center. They finished the season 18–14, 10–6 in Southland play to finish in third place in the West Division. They lost in the quarterfinals of the Southland Basketball tournament to McNeese State.

Roster

Media
All Roadrunners games are broadcast on KRPT. Video of all non-televised home games can be found at goUTSA.com.

Schedule and results
Source
All times are Central

|-
!colspan=9 style=| Exhibition

|-
!colspan=9 style=| Regular season

|-
!colspan=9 style=| Southland Tournament

References

UTSA Roadrunners men's basketball seasons
Utsa
UTSA Roadrunners basketball
UTSA Roadrunners basketball